Rindler Creek is a stream that rises on Sulfur Springs Mountain in southwestern Solano County, California.  A stream restoration project has been conducted to reverse the damage of cattle overgrazing. One goal of this project is to enhance habitat suitable for the endangered Northern Red-legged Frog.  Water quality has been altered in Rindler Creek due to historic cinnabar extraction in this watershed.

Cinnabar deposits were mined from this locale in the early 1900s via Hastings Mine and St. John's Mine.  Shaft construction occurred no earlier than 1918 and mining had ceased by the year 1930.

See also
Blue Rock Springs Creek
List of watercourses in the San Francisco Bay Area
Serpentine soil

References

Rivers of Solano County, California
Rivers of Northern California
Tributaries of Napa River